Clay DeBord (born May 13, 1992) is a former American football offensive guard. He played college football at Eastern Washington University. He signed with the Arizona Cardinals out of college and also played for the New England Patriots and the Dallas Cowboys.

Early years
DeBord attended Asotin High School in Asotin, Washington where he earned All-Southeast 2B League honors as a senior and he helped guide Asotin to a 3-2 league record and 5-3 overall mark. In his junior year, Asotin finished 5-1 in the league and 8-1 overall.

College career
During his time at Eastern Washington University (EWU), DeBord recorded a school record of 51 career starts. As a freshman in the 2012 season DeBord started in 13 games at left offensive tackle due to being redshirted but missed a Sacramento State  game with an ankle injury.

He made his debut start against Idaho and helped Eastern Washington rank seventh in the FCS in passing yards per game with a record of 318.9. As a sophomore in the 2013 season Clay Debord was selected to the second-team All-Big Sky. DeBord earned team offensive player of the week after EWU's 41-19 win over Weber State where they recorded 493 yards of offense. He helped Eastern set Big Sky and school records with 592 points, 83 touchdowns and 8,002 yards of offense in the 2013 season.

In the 2014 season DeBord earned honorable mention All-Big Sky accolades after starting all 14 Eastern games at left offensive tackle. He also earned second-team all-league honors from College Sports Madness. He and left guard Aaron Neary were the team's co-offensive players of the week after helping EWU rush for 224 yards and finish with 582 total yards in a 52-51 win at Montana State. In 2015 Debord was listed as a starter at left offensive tackle on the preseason depth chart. He was a first-team selection on the STATS preseason FCS All-America team.

Professional career

Arizona Cardinals
On May 2, 2016, DeBord was signed as an undrafted free agent by the Arizona Cardinals. He was waived on August 29, 2016.

New England Patriots
On September 5, 2016, DeBord was signed to the New England Patriots' practice squad. He was released on September 15.

Dallas Cowboys
On September 28, 2016, DeBord was signed to the Dallas Cowboys' practice squad. He was released on November 8. On January 17, 2017, he signed a reserve/future contract with the Cowboys.

On September 2, 2017, DeBord was waived by the Cowboys.

Retirement
On September 3, 2017, DeBord announced his retirement from the NFL.

Personal life
DeBord is a technology major. He was born May 13, 1992 in Lewiston, Idaho. His parents are Levirn DeBord and Martha MacNeil.

References

External links
Stats 
Eastern Washington bio
New England Patriots bio

1992 births
Living people
People from Lewiston, Idaho
Players of American football from Washington (state)
American football offensive guards
Eastern Washington Eagles football players
Arizona Cardinals players
New England Patriots players
Dallas Cowboys players
People from Asotin County, Washington